Church of Saint Vigilius of Trent ( is a Roman Catholic church in the town of Pinzolo, in the province of Trentino and the region of Trentino-Alto Adige/Südtirol, Italy.

External links

Churches in Trentino-Alto Adige/Südtirol
Romanesque architecture in Italy